Northwest Airlines was a major United States airline which existed from 1926 until 2010, when it merged with Delta Air Lines.  At the time of the merger it had a total of 309 aircraft.  It was also the last U.S. airline to have a dedicated cargo fleet and routes.

Northwest, unlike Delta, operated a mixed fleet of Boeing, McDonnell Douglas, and Airbus aircraft. The Boeing 757 was the only type of jet common to the pre-merger fleets of both Delta and Northwest. The Northwest fleet was integrated into Delta's fleet on December 31, 2009. The airline ceased operations and merged into Delta in 2010. Most of Northwest's Boeing 747 fleet was sent to Delta which had retired all of its own 747s in the 1970s.

Pre-merger Northwest Airlines fleet
As part of a major fleet renewal program, Northwest introduced a simplified new paint scheme and logo in 2003, emphasizing its callsign (NWA). The airline replaced its McDonnell Douglas DC-10 airliners with the Airbus A330. Its first Airbus A330-300, used initially for European flights, arrived on August 6, 2003. Northwest also flew the longer ranged and slightly shorter A330-200 on some trans-Pacific flights, within the Orient, and on some trans-Atlantic routes. The majority of Northwest's flights between North America and Europe were flown in Airbus A330s. (Northwest became the largest owner and flier of A330s in the world.) Northwest Airlines also possessed the youngest trans-Atlantic fleet of any North American or European airline. Northwest Airlines also began flying reconfigured Boeing 757-200 airliners on some of its European flights carrying fewer passengers. Northwest was one of only two passenger airlines in the United States to fly the Boeing 747-400, with the only other one being United Airlines. One Boeing 747-400 originally destined to fly for Northwest Airlines was sold to United Airlines which was in service until United retired its 747 fleet in 2017.

Northwest was looking for manufacturers to discuss the replacement of their 100, 110 and 125 seat McDonnell Douglas DC-9 aircraft, with an average age of 35 years.

In January 2008, Northwest advised its pilots that the airline planned to cut its fleet of 92 DC-9s to 68 by the end of 2008. Northwest stated that pilot jobs will not be reduced, as they would hire approximately 200–250 pilots by the end of 2008. On April 23, 2008, due to soaring fuel costs from $1.85 in the first quarter of 2007 to $2.77 in the first quarter of 2008, Northwest announced that an additional 15 to 20 aircraft would be removed from its fleet by the end of 2009. The grounded aircraft included ten or so DC-9s, with the balance of the 15 to 20 being a mix of 10 Boeing 757s and 4 Airbus A320s.

The airline's average fleet age was 18.5 years by the end of 2009. The Boeing customer code for Northwest Airlines was 7x7-x51 (i.e. 747-451). As of October 29, 2008, at the time of the merger, Northwest Airlines' fleet consisted of the following aircraft:

Fleet gallery

Retired Northwest Airlines fleet

NWA Fleet in 1960

Prior to 1960, Northwest operated several other types of piston powered propeller airliners including Lockheed L-10 Electra, Lockheed L-14 Super Electra, Lockheed Constellation (L-1049G model) and Martin 2-0-2 aircraft.

NWA Fleet in 1970

NWA Fleet in 1980

NWA Fleet in 1990

NWA Fleet in 2000

Northwest Airlink fleet

According to the Northwest Airlines historical website, a number of regional and commuter air carriers operated service as Northwest Airlink over the years via respective code sharing agreements to include the following airlines and aircraft types:

Big Sky Airlines - British Aerospace BAe Jetstream 31, Swearingen Metro
Compass Airlines - Canadair CRJ200/CRJ440, Embraer 175
Eugene Aviation Service - Piper PA-23
Express Airlines I/II - British Aerospace BAe Jetstream 31, Canadair CRJ200/CRJ440, Saab 340
Fischer Brothers Aviation - CASA 212, Dornier 228, Short 360
Mesaba Airlines - Avro RJ85, Beechcraft 99, Canadair CRJ200/CRJ440/CRJ900, de Havilland Canada DHC-8 Dash 8, Fokker F27, Saab 340, Swearingen Metro
Northeast Express Regional Airlines - de Havilland Canada DHC-8 Dash 8, Swearingen Metro
Pacific Island Aviation - Short 360
Pinnacle Airlines - Canadair CRJ200/CRJ440/CRJ900, Saab 340
Precision Airlines - Beechcraft 99, Dornier 228

Northwest Cargo 

As of 2006, Northwest Cargo was the largest cargo carrier among U.S. combination passenger and cargo airlines. Northwest Cargo's fleet of 15 dedicated Boeing 747 freighter aircraft flew from key cities throughout the United States and Asia and connected the carrier's cargo hub in Anchorage, Alaska, United States (Ted Stevens Anchorage International Airport), facilitating the quick transfer of cargo between large cities on both sides of the Pacific. Northwest Cargo also transported freight aboard the passenger fleet of Northwest Airlines to more than 250 cities worldwide.

As of early 2008, Northwest's largest cargo client was DHL International. In December 2007, Northwest announced that DHL International would terminate its cargo agreement with the airline effective late 2008. According to NWA Chief Financial Officer Dave Davis, the loss of its largest cargo client would bring significant changes to the division.

Northwest Cargo served airports and routes not served by the passenger operation — the last U.S. carrier to maintain a separate fleet and route network exclusively for cargo. Such cargo-only cities on Northwest's route map included Wilmington, Ohio, and cargo only routes included Chicago, Illinois to Anchorage, Alaska.

On April 21, 2009, Delta announced they were grounding 8 of their Boeing 747-200 freighter aircraft on December 31, 2009. The last flight of a dedicated cargo aircraft was December 26, 2009. Currently, Delta maintains freight activity on some of their passenger aircraft's lower deck.

References

Citations

Bibliography

Northwest Airlines
Northwest Airlines